"Too Late" is a song by American EDM group Cash Cash featuring American rapper Wiz Khalifa and Danish pop band Lukas Graham. It was released on February 12, 2021, via Big Beat Records, included Cash Cash's fifth studio album Say It Like You Feel It.

Background
In a remote interview with Flaunt, JP Makhlouf explain they track started with Forchhammer: "Lucas made the hook, sent us the hook and we built the track around the hook." Afterward they sent it to different people. Subsequently Khalifa recorded a part of the track, and was appreciated by Cash Cash, finally they completed it.

Forchhammer told to ABC Audio: "It's, like, so pandemic-y, very COVID-19-friendly collaboration, sending things back and forth, it was very fun but super-weird, like, writing a whole song without talking to each other...just sending emails back and forth!"

Content
According to a press release, "Too Late" is "a sentimental, emotional anthem", and "a compelling single featuring undeniable."

Critical reception
Natalie Wicks of EDM Unplugged commented the song "[is] a heartwarming single that is both captivating and catchy as the vocals soar with a persevering message to always "do what’s right" and "hold on.""

Track listing

Credits and personnel
Credits adapted from AllMusic.

 Cash Cash – primary artist
 Lukas Graham – primary artist
 Wiz Khalifa – primary artist

Charts

Weekly charts

Year-end charts

References

2021 songs
2021 singles
Cash Cash songs
Wiz Khalifa songs
Lukas Graham songs
Songs written by Wiz Khalifa
Songs written by Mustard (record producer)
Songs written by Lukas Forchhammer
Atlantic Records singles